In 2012, there were 29 new This American Life episodes.

This American Life retracted this episode two months after it was originally broadcast, after learning that Mike Daisey exaggerated or fabricated various claims about his experiences in China.  The investigation behind the retraction is the subject of episode 460, "Retraction."
Act 1: Mr. Daisey Goes to China – Mike Daisey
Act 2: Act One – Ira Glass

Act 1: Currency of Dreams
Act 2: Eurotopia
Act 3: Ooh, I Shouldn't Have Done That!
Act 4: Do-Over
Act 5: What's a Greek Accountant Got to Do with Me?

Act 1: Alien Experiment
Act 2: Ain't Nobody Here But Us Chickens – Danny Lobell

Act 1: Best Laid Plans
Act 2: 21 Chump Street
Act 3: Cold Stone Dreamery – Ben Loory
Act 4: Fantastic Mr. Fox – Jeanne Darst

Act 1: The Audacity of Louis Ortiz – Ryan Murdock
Act 2: Wife Lessons

Act 1: The Sound of Sirens
Act 2: Dream Come True
Act 3: Do You Want a Wake Up Call?

The entire episode is spent retracting and examining Episode 454, including further investigation of claims made by Daisey by Glass, Rob Schmitz, the Shanghai correspondent for Marketplace, and New York Times reporter Charles Duhigg.
Act 1: Cathy's Account
Act 2: Mike's Account
Act 3: News That's Fit to Print

Act 1: The Hamster Wheel
Act 2: Pac Men
Act 3: The O.G.S.

Act 1: Aces Are Wild
Act 2: The Conversation
Act 3: Just as I Am

Act 1: The Postcard Always Rings Twice
Act 2: The Disenchanted Forest – Jonathan Goldstein
Act 3: The Geeks Come Out at Night

A rebroadcast of portions of the live show broadcast into movie theaters on May 3, 2012.
Act 1: Does a Bear Hit in the Woods?
Act 2: Groundhog Dayne – With Special Guest Taylor Dayne
Act 3: Stiff as a Board, Light as a Feather – David Rakoff
Act 4: Turn Around Bright Eyes – David Sedaris

Act 1: Act One
Act 2: Act Two

Act 1: Render Unto Caesar's Palace What Is Due to Caesar's Palace
Act 2: Harrah's Today, Gone Tomorrow

Act 1: Why Do You Have to Go and Make Things So Complicated?
Act 2: Beautiful Downtown Wasteland

Act 1: Healthy Start
Act 2: Forgive Us Our Press Passes
Act 3: Runaway Groom

Act 1: There's Something About Mary
Act 2: Objects May Be Closer Than They Appear
Act 3: Seven Year Snitch

Act 1: Just South of the Unicorns
Act 2: Oh the Places You Will Not Go!

Act 1: Gym Rat
Act 2: Act Two

A special episode devoted to the late David Rakoff. The episode consists of stories and interviews over the course of years with the radio show.
65. Who's Canadian?
116. Poultry Slam 1998
241. 20 Acts in 60 Minutes
156. What Remains
208. Office Politics
Interview with Terry Gross
"Rent" Monologue
12. Animals
470. Show Me the Way  – with Jonathan Goldstein
389. Frenemies
Excerpts from "Love Dishonor, Marry, Die; Cherish, Perish...A Novel by David Rakoff"

Act 1: Death Takes a Policy

Act 1: No, These Things Will Not Be on the Final Exam
Act 2: Act Two

Act 1: The Motherhood of the Traveling Pants
Act 2: Message in a Bottle
Act 3: Soul Sister
Act 4: Worst Mixtape Ever

Act 1: Too Soon?
Act 2: Just Keep Breathing
Act 3: A Real Nail Biter
Act 4: The Year After

Act 1: Take Your Kid to Work Day
Act 2: Get Away with It After the Beep
Act 3: Crime and Tutus
Act 4: Pre K-O

Act 1: I Know You Are, but What Am I?
Act 2: Nothing in Moderation

Act 1: Act One
Act 2: Act Two

Act 1: Semper Fido
Act 2: Run Rabbit. No, Really, Run!
Act 3: Human Sacrifice

Act 1: Kabul, Afghanistan
Act 2: Tucson, Arizona
Act 3: Washington, D.C.
Act 4: New Orleans, LA
Act 5: Cairo, Egypt
Act 6: Boston, Logan Airport; Chicago, IL; Springfield, OR

Act 1: Christmas in 3-D
Act 2: Deer in the Footlights
Act 3: Piddler on the Roof

External links
This American Lifes radio archive for 2012

2012
This American Life
This American Life